A gold–silver–bronze command structure is a command hierarchy used for major operations by the emergency services of the United Kingdom. 

Some practitioners use the term strategic–tactical–operational command structure instead, but the different categories are equivalent. In some cases, the national government (via the Cabinet Office Briefing Rooms) will assume ultimate control and act as a "platinum" level.

The three roles are not restricted to any rank, though invariably the chain of command will be the same as the order of rank. Whilst the gold–silver–bronze command structure was designed for responding to sudden major incidents, it has also been used for planned operations, such as the policing of football matches, or firearms operations, such as Operation Kratos.

History
The structure was created by the Metropolitan Police Service, as a direct response to the Broadwater Farm riot. The riot broke out in North London on 6 October 1985 and led to the murder of PC Keith Blakelock.

The Metropolitan Police realised that their usual rank-based command system was inappropriate for sudden events. For example, it was never clear who was actually in operational charge of the police response on the night of the riot. A small team, including Inspector Peter Power, quickly decided that three essential roles were more important than numerous ranks in these situations. They set about creating and implementing a new structure that could be used. The "Gold–silver–bronze" naming was coined by David Stevens, a Chief Superintendent in the Public Order Branch who also worked on Power's team.

The structure soon spread to other police forces and to other emergency services. Though originally devised for the response to sudden incidents, it has also been used for pre-planned operations.

The concept of operational, tactical and strategic command levels has been in existence for many years, only the titles have changed. The concept and explanations of it have been reinforced since the introduction of the Civil Contingencies Act 2004 (CCA). 

Ministerial involvement will usually be fed in and responded to via one of the emergency services, inevitably due to their role as defined by the CCA, the police gold commander.

Gold
The gold commander is in overall control of their organisation's resources at the incident. This person will not be on site, but at a distant control room, gold command, where they will formulate the strategy for dealing with the incident. Most gold commanders will be inside a control room and will not be located elsewhere. If the gold commanders for various organisations at an incident are not co-located, they will be in constant touch with each other by videoconference or telephone.

The CCA requires police to host and chair the multi-agency gold command. This responsibility will usually fall to the local chief constable or their nominated deputy.

Silver
The silver commander is the tactical commander who manages tactical implementation following the strategic direction given by Gold and makes it into sets of actions that are completed by Bronze. Whether the Silver commander is present at the scene varies by incident and organisation. Silver commanders for the fire service tend to be present at the scene, while those for the police tend not to be. Other organisations make their own decisions, although many are encouraged to attend or send a representative to the police-led multi-agency silver command as detailed in the CCA.

The police silver command could be located in a command vehicle at or near the scene or a remote building such as the police HQ. There is a common misconception that all emergency services share one big control room and emergency control centre. This is generally not the case.

Bronze
A bronze commander directly controls an organisation's resources at the incident and will be found with their staff working at the scene. A commander or representative from each involved responder will be present and take direction from their organization.

If an incident is widespread geographically, different bronze commanders may assume responsibility for different locations. If the incident is of a complex nature, as is often the case, different bronze commanders are given their own tasks or responsibilities at an incident, for example taking statements, cordon management, or survivor management.

Command structure in practice
The 2005 Buncefield fire is an example of how the command structure functions.  After the explosions on Sunday, 11 December 2005, the strategic operation to bring the incident under control was commenced at Hertfordshire Constabulary's headquarters in Welwyn Garden City, some distance from the incident.

Hertfordshire Fire and Rescue Service's Chief Fire Officer Roy Wilsher was based at Gold Command "within one hour of the incident".
Bronze was situated on the fire ground and was a Hertfordshire fire service control unit. Each of the services had its own senior officers who assumed the roles of gold, silver, and bronze.

During the first three days of the fire, the gold command committee met at 11:00 a.m. and 2:00 p.m.; each session was usually followed by a media briefing. The command meetings were attended by the commanders of the main emergency services, local authority, health and safety officials, and civilian press officers from the emergency services.

The effectiveness of elements of interoperability and communications with this structure have been called into question by the Pollock Report of 2013.

See also
 Emergency management
 Incident command system
 Control of Major Accident Hazards Regulations 1999

References

External links
 Wiltshire Police: Major incident planning: Command structure
 London Emergency Services Liaison Panel: LESLP
 Suffolk County Council: Control of major accident hazards
 Government Office for the South East: Preparing for Emergencies – Response
 Government Office for the South East: Response: the National Picture
 Emergency Management Portal: Online resources for UK emergency managers

Emergency management in the United Kingdom
Incident management